H14 may refer to:
 , a British Royal Navy destroyer which saw service during World War II
 , a Royal Australian Navy destroyer in service in the 1920s
 London Buses route H14, a public transportation route in England